The NWA Southeastern Heavyweight Championship was a title controlled by and defended in NWA Smoky Mountain Wrestling.  It was first awarded on February 4, 2011 when Chris Richards, the reigning CWA Heavyweight Championship, was awarded the NWA Smoky Mountain Heavyweight Championship

Title history

Reigns

See also
List of National Wrestling Alliance championships

References

External links
Title history at Cagematch.net

United States regional professional wrestling championships
National Wrestling Alliance championships
Heavyweight wrestling championships